Paulo Ganem Souto (born November 19, 1943) is a Brazilian geologist and politician. He served as governor of Bahia from 1995 to 1999 and from 2003 to 2007. He was also a senator from 1999 to 2003.

Governor of Bahia
In 1994, Souto run-off for governor, against Durval. Magalhães's TV Bahia, helped Souto to victory.

In 1995, Souto took place as governor, and created Blue Bahia and others programs.

In 1999, Souto took place as senator.

In 2002, With support of Gomes, Souto was elected governor. In the second round, Souto supported Lula.

In 2005, Souto broke with the government of Lula.

In 2006, Souto run-off, but was defeated by Jaques Wagner.

References

1943 births
Democrats (Brazil) politicians
Democratic Social Party politicians
Governors of Bahia
Living people
Members of the Federal Senate (Brazil)
Place of birth missing (living people)